Chinchin is a village in the Berd Municipality of the Tavush Province of Armenia. The 12th-century Kaptavank Monastery is located near the village.

Gallery

References

External links 

Populated places in Tavush Province